Back into the Darkness is the fifth album by Tito & Tarantula, released in 2008.

Track listing

Personnel 
 Tito Larriva – vocals, guitar
 Steven Hufsteter – guitar, backing vocals
 Caroline Rippy – bass, backing vocals
 Rafael Gayol – drums, percussion, backing vocals

Additional personnel 
 Alfredo Ortiz – drums
 Marcus Praed – organ, piano, tambourine, guitar, backing vocals

Production 
 Marcus Praed – engineer, mastering
 Martin Engirt – mastering

2008 albums
Tito & Tarantula albums